The golden sun of La Tolita, also known as the golden sun of Konanz or golden sun of Quito, is a mask or headdress decoration that represents a sun with a face. The origin of this piece is typically attributed to the Tumaco-La Tolita archaeological culture of the northern Ecuadorian coast and southern Colombian coast. However, there are doubts about the true origin of the Golden sun.

There is another very similar piece also known as the golden sun of Guayaquil or golden sun of Estrada.

The Central Bank of Ecuador adopted this sun as its logo.

History 
The Golden sun of La Tolita was acquired by collector Max Konanz in 1940, who bought it from Cornelio Vintimilla Muñoz, a merchant from the city of Cuenca, who in turn bought it from Ariolfo Vásquez Moreira. The information given by the seller said that the mask would have been found between 1939 and 1940 in a place called Chuncari, between Chordeleg and Sígsig, in the province of Azuay, Ecuador. This area is known for its very rich burials. Unfortunately, this information is not reliable, since the sun was found by looters, who sometimes lie about the provenance of archaeological finds. Despite this, Konanz accepted the origin indicated by the seller.

The piece was folded into a ball when Konanz acquired it. It was probably folded by the looters who found it to facilitate its transport. The collector, along with his wife Dolores Vintimilla, unfolded the piece, but several sun rays broke on the spot.

Casa de la Cultura Ecuatoriana published a picture of the golden sun in a 1953 bulletin. Shortly after, in the mid-1950s, archaeologist Emilio Estrada acquired the second golden sun in Manabí. It is suspected that this new sun may be fake because of some typological inconsistencies and the closeness of its find to the publication date of the Golden sun of La Tolita.

In 1960, the Central Bank of Ecuador bought Max Konanz's collection and adopted the Golden sun as its logo. At that time, the origin indicated by Vásquez Moreira was questioned. Through typological analysis, it was concluded that the origin of the piece must be the Tolita culture of the Ecuadorian Coast. In 1978, the Central Bank also bought the Golden sun of Estrada.

Decoration 

Both suns have a rectangular face from which zigzaging sun rays are born. The rays are clustered into five groups. These go to the left, right, up, down and left, and down and right, but neither goes down from the centre. Throughout the entire piece there are relief decorations achieved using the embossing.

Face 
Both suns have a rectangular face, inside which there is a T-shaped section where the eyes, nose and mouth are located. The eyes and the nose have a similar shape on both suns, but in the mouth is a little different. While both headdresses have a slightly downward-twisted mouth, the one on the Golden sun of La Tolita has four fangs that do not exist on the Golden sun of Estrada.

Ears 
In the Golden sun of La Tolita, the ears consist of two concentric semicircles from which three lines are born that presumably represent earrings. There is a hole in the center of the semicircles that presumably would serve to attach it to its mounting.

On the other hand, in the Golden sun of Estrada, the ears consist of a double spiral placed backwards. The holes are between them and the face . Although this type of ears has been seen in other Andean cultures, they are usually looking to another direction. This typological inconsistency was pointed out by archaeologist Karen Olsen Bruhns to suggest the possibility that this piece is fake.

Crested Animal 
At the base of the upper cluster of rays is a two-headed crested animal. This exists exclusively in the golden sun of La Tolita, while in the golden sun of Estrada this area is empty. The animal is very similar to the Animal of the Moon of the Moche culture. The archaeologist Costanza Di Capua pointed out the existence of very similar figures in other pieces of La Tolita to argue that this culture was the origin place of the golden sun.

Sun rays 
The rays of both suns are in pairs. They are an example of what archaeologist John H. Rowe called "Kennings". These are an artistic element of South American prehistory that consists of turning the long and thin appendages of any piece into snakes.

The Golden sun of La Tolita has 48 symmetrically located rays. Most of them are broken, only 12 are complete. A raised line runs through the center of each ray. The serpent heads in this piece hold in their mouths another head called "Trophy Head", which has a face in the same T-shape as the central face. These heads have a tall headdress. Very similar heads can be seen in other pieces from the Tumaco-La Tolita, which supports the argument that this culture is the true origin of the headdress.

Chemical composition 
In order to know if the whether the origin of the Golden sun is the one indicated by Ariolfo Vásquez (the province of Azuay) or if it comes from the Ecuadorian or Colombian coast, the Central Bank ordered physical-chemical analyzes to be carried out on the two golden suns and several samples from pre-Columbian goldsmith pieces from Ecuador. It was concluded that the gold with which the pieces were made is similar to that of other pieces from the Ecuadorian Coast, suggesting that the origin is Tumaco-La Tolita.

It was also found that both golden suns have a very similar chemical composition. This could indicate that they were made in the same workshop.

References 

Archaeology of Ecuador
Archaeological artifacts
Archaeological discoveries in South America